Four ships in the United States Navy have been named USS Rowan after Stephen Clegg Rowan.

 The first  was a torpedo boat, commissioned in 1899 and decommissioned in 1912.

United States Navy ship names